Sergey Anatolyevich Myaus (born 4 February 1959 in Kemerovo) is a Russian bandy manager and executive and former bandy player. He is a vice president of the Russian Bandy Federation (Федерация хоккея с мячом России), member of the FIB technical committee and a former head coach of the national bandy team.

He was a part of the delegation to China in September 2017 and the FIB representative at the second China-Russia University Winter Sports Carnival in Harbin in December same year.

Myaus played bandy in Kuzbass Kemerovo in 1978—1993.

References

Russian bandy executives
Russian bandy players
Kuzbass Kemerovo players
Soviet bandy players
1959 births
Living people